Riceville is an unincorporated community in Crawford County, Indiana, in the United States.

History
Riceville contained a post office between 1882 and 1942. The community was named in honor of Wash Rice.

References

Unincorporated communities in Crawford County, Indiana
Unincorporated communities in Indiana